Nand Ghar is a social initiative of the Anil Agarwal Foundation, the philanthropic arm of the Vedanta Group. The project aims to transform the lives of 7 crore children and 2 crore women across the 13.7 Lakh Anganwadi centres by providing online education, primary healthcare, nutritional requirements and economically skill training for women across India. Project Nand Ghar modernises Anganwadis functioning under the Integrated Child Development Scheme (ICDS), this includes infrastructural improvements.

Nand Ghar is a collaborative project between Vedanta and the Union Ministry of Women and Child Development, with an MoU signed up for developing 4000 modern Anganwadis as Nand Ghars across India, for the development of women and children.

The first Nand Ghar was established in the Nagepur district of Varanasi in April 2016. The then Minister of Textiles, Smriti Zubin Irani inaugurated the first centre under the project.

History 
(ICDS)

The Integrated Child Development Services (ICDS) Scheme is the biggest community-based programme in the world. The ICDS serves children up to the age of six, pregnant and lactating mothers, and adolescent girls. It commenced on 2 October 1975 and has completed 47 years of operation. Its objective is to improve the nutritional and health condition of children aged 0-6 years and build the basis for proper psychological, physical, and social development. It aims to improve the mother's capacity to care for her child's basic health and nutritional requirements via nutrition and health education.

Partnership 
Nand Ghar is a partnership between Vedanta and the Ministry of Women & Child Development. Bill & Melinda Gates Foundation also entered the partnership later.

Presence and scale 
Currently, over 3000 Nand Ghars are present in 13 states in India: Rajasthan, Uttar Pradesh, Madhya Pradesh, Karnataka, Chhattisgarh, Jharkhand, Gujarat, Goa, Assam, Himachal Pradesh, Punjab, Haryana and Odisha.

Awards and recognition 

 Awarded the CSR Project of the Year Award at the India CSR Summit 2021
 It was awarded the "CSR Shining Star Award" in the area of child development in 2021 for Nand Ghar, the Vedanta Group's main corporate social responsibility initiative.
 The Rajasthan Government has recognised it as the Best Corporate Social Responsibility (CSR) effort under the 'Indira Mahila Shakti Protsahan Evam Samman Yojana' in 2021.

Nand Ghar during pandemic 
On International Women’s Day 2021, Nand Ghar launched its telemedicine model which was inaugurated by the Union Minister of Women and Child Development, Smriti Zubin Irani.

With the help of technological support and telemedicine health model, it linked MBBS physicians and specialists such as pediatricians and gynecologists with community members. It also provided facility of mobile health vans that visited the Nand Ghars with specialist consultation, basic non-invasive tests, and free medicine to community members.

During pandemic, Nand Ghar provided education for children through the rolling out of content on WhatsApp and through IVRS as an alternative method to learning. With these initiatives, Nand Ghar provided e-Learning content to more than 55,000+children in rural areas. Nand Ghar’s e-content was adopted by the 62000 Anganwadis in Rajasthan.

Women of Nand Ghar stitched 1.5 Lakh masks, which were distributed amongst community members to protect them from the virus.

References 

Government schemes in India
Child care
Ministry of Women and Children Affairs
Bill & Melinda Gates Foundation people
Jharkhand Party (Naren) politicians